Coast Guard Station Burlington, Vermont is a United States Coast Guard station established in 1948 as a four-man light attendant station on Juniper Island. Currently the Station is located on the waterfront of Burlington, Vermont, in a facility built in 1993.  Some of the missions they conduct are Maritime Law enforcement, Search and Rescue, and Ice Rescue. They currently operate one 29’ RBSII and one 45’ RBM.

Their primary area of responsibility is Lake Champlain and are based out of Burlington.

References

United States Coast Guard stations
Military installations in Vermont
Buildings and structures in Burlington, Vermont